The Rockwell RPRV-870 HiMAT (Highly Maneuverable Aircraft Technology) is an experimental remotely piloted aircraft that was produced for a NASA program to develop technologies for future fighter aircraft. Among the technologies explored were close-coupled canards, fully digital flight control (including propulsion), composite materials (graphite and fiberglass), remote piloting, synthetic vision systems, winglets, and others.

Two aircraft were produced by Rockwell International. Their first flights took place in 1979, and testing was completed in 1983.

Design and development
The HiMATs were remotely piloted, as the design team decided that it would be cheaper and safer to not risk a pilot's life during the experiments. This also meant that no ejection seat would have to be fitted. The aircraft was flown by a pilot in a remote cockpit, and control signals up-linked from the flight controls in the remote cockpit on the ground to the aircraft, and aircraft telemetry downlinked to the remote cockpit displays. The remote cockpit could be configured with either nose camera video or with a 3D synthetic vision display called a "visual display". The aircraft were launched from a B-52 Stratofortress at altitude. There was also a TF-104G Starfighter chase plane with a set of backup controls which could take control of the HiMAT in the event that the remote pilot on the ground lost control.

Advances in digital flight control gained during the project contributed to the Grumman X-29 experimental aircraft, and composite construction are used widely on both commercial and military aircraft.

Initial concept included a wedge-shaped exhaust nozzle with 2D thrust vectoring.

Aircraft on display
The two HiMAT aircraft are now on display, one at the National Air and Space Museum and the other at the Armstrong Flight Research Center.

Specifications

Gallery

See also
 List of experimental aircraft
 Rockwell-MBB X-31
 McDonnell Douglas X-36
 NASA X-38

References

Further reading

External links

 HiMAT Research Vehicle at Boeing.com

NASA vehicles
HiMAT
Unmanned aerial vehicles of the United States
1970s United States experimental aircraft
Canard aircraft
Mid-wing aircraft
Single-engined jet aircraft
Twin-boom aircraft
Aircraft first flown in 1979